On 17 March 2000, 778 members of the Movement for the Restoration of the Ten Commandments of God died in Uganda. The theory that all of the members died in a mass suicide was changed to mass murder when bodies were discovered in pits, some with signs of strangulation while others had stab wounds. 

The group had diverged from the Roman Catholic Church in order to emphasize apocalypticism and alleged Marian apparitions. The group had been called an inward-looking movement that wore matching uniforms and restricted their speech to avoid saying anything dishonest or sinful.

On the suicide itself locals said they held a party at which 70 crates of soft drinks and three bulls were consumed. This version of events has been criticized, most notably by Irving Hexham, and an unidentified Ugandan source states that "no one can really explain the whys, hows, whats, where, when, etcetera."

References 

2000 in Uganda
Death in Uganda
History of Uganda
March 2000 events in Africa
Mass murder in 2000
Mass suicides
Movement for the Restoration of the Ten Commandments of God